The Grand Valley Diversion Dam is a diversion dam in the De Beque Canyon of the Colorado River, about  northeast of Grand Junction, Colorado in the United States.

A small hydroelectric plant with a capacity of 3,000 kilowatts (KW) was completed in 1933 on the Orchard Mesa Power Canal, a branch of the Government Highline Canal. In 1949, the dam and canal system were transferred to the Grand Valley Water Users Association, while the power plant was consigned to the Orchard Mesa Irrigation District.

Grand Valley Diversion Dam was listed on the National Register of Historic Places on October 8, 1991.

References

External links

Dams on the National Register of Historic Places in Colorado
Buildings and structures in Mesa County, Colorado
Dams in Colorado
United States Bureau of Reclamation dams
Dams completed in 1916
Roller dams
Dams on the Colorado River
Historic American Engineering Record in Colorado
Historic districts on the National Register of Historic Places in Colorado
National Register of Historic Places in Mesa County, Colorado
1916 establishments in Colorado